Busswil railway station is a railway station in the municipality of Lyss, in the Swiss canton of Bern.

Services 
The following services stop at Busswil:

References

External links 
 
 

Railway stations in the canton of Bern
Swiss Federal Railways stations